Hyalothyrus is a genus of skippers in the family Hesperiidae, in which it is placed in tribe Entheini.

Species
Hyalothyrus infernalis (Moschler, 1877) French Guiana, Suriname
Hyalothyrus infa Evans, 1952 Colombia, Brazil (Amazonas)
Hyalothyrus leucomelas (Geyer, [1832]) Brazil (Amazonas)
Hyalothyrus mimicus Mabille & Boullet, 1919 Peru
Hyalothyrus neleus (Linnaeus, 1758) 
H. neleus neleus (Linnaeus, 1758) Peru
H. neleus pemphigargyra (Mabille, 1888) Mexico, Panama, Colombia
Hyalothyrus neda Evans, 1952 Bolivia
Hyalothyrus nitocris (Stoll, [1782]) Suriname

Habitats 

Hyalothyrus neleus is restricted to primary rainforest at altitudes between sea level and about 800 metres.

Lifecycle 

H. neleus caterpillars feed on Inga ( Fabaceae ) and are a dirty greenish colour, with a series of prominent pale green spots along the sides, and a large shiny reddish brown head. The internal organs and digestive system are clearly visible through the translucent skin. There is no information about the pupa, but in common with other Pyrgine skippers it is likely to be dark and smooth, with the wing cases in a contrasting tone or colour.

Adult behaviour 
Adults of H. neleus are social and primarily active at dusk, or on overcast days.

References

Natural History Museum Lepidoptera genus database

Eudaminae
Hesperiidae genera
Taxa named by Paul Mabille